Dr Thom Van Every is a UK trained medical doctor, entrepreneur and children's author. He is considered a pioneer in the UK of online medical services having launched through his website Dr Thom the first regulated online medical clinic, the first home HIV testing service, and in partnership with the Chelsea and Westminster Hospital NHS Foundation Trust the first NHS online service 

He graduated from the University of Birmingham Medical School in 1995. He is a member of the Royal College of Obstetricians and Gynaecologists. He also holds an MBA from London Business School.

Dr Thom was purchased by pharmacy chain Lloydspharmacy in 2011.

He also co-founded and acted as Medical Director for a private medical insurance provider called PatientChoice. PatientChoice was purchased by Westfield Health in 2011.

He was also a co-founding investor and advisor to California-based telemedicine business Lemonaid Health, which was purchased by 23AndMe in 2021.

He is the author the children's picture book 'The Strictest Teacher in All of France'.

In 2014 he completed a solo swim of the English Channel in just over 14hrs. He has also completed a swim from Robben Island to Cape Town, Alcatraz and the Lake Zurich 26 km marathon swim.

He is currently UK Medical Director for ViiV Healthcare, a joint venture between GSK, Pfizer and Shionogi, focused on HIV, and was previously Executive Director of ViiV's 'hive' innovation unit,. He also sits on the Advisory Board of Ieso Digital Health, a provider of internet-enabled CBT and HomeTouch, an elderly care digital service. He is also an investor in PatientsKnowBest.

References

External links 
 www.drthom.com
 www.polkadoc.com
 www.lemonaidhealth.com

Year of birth missing (living people)
Living people